Howard V. Shaylor (July 21, 1891 – February 20, 1973) was a member of the Ohio House of Representatives, serving Ashtabula County from 1953 to 1958.

References

Members of the Ohio House of Representatives
1891 births
1973 deaths
20th-century American politicians